Pasir Salak (Jawi: ڤاسير سالق) is a mukim and historical riverside town in Perak Tengah District, Perak, Malaysia, about 45 minutes from the state capital, Ipoh.

The British colonial official J.W.W. Birch, who had been sent to take up the position of the first British Resident in Perak, was assassinated at Pasir Salak as the result of a conspiracy involving the local chiefs Dato Maharaja Lela and Sepuntum. The British responded to Birch's assassination with a military intervention during the Perak War.

Today, Pasir Salak is also the name of the parliamentary constituency.

Notable places
J.W.W Birch Memorial
Pasir Salak Mosque
Kutai Traditional House (Rumah Kutai)
Makam Sepuntum
Dato Maharaja Lela Memorial
Birch's murder site
Jetty
Pasir Salak historical tunnel
Perak's Menteri Besar Gallery
Pasir Salak Resort
No wonder Lah land

References

Mukims of Perak
Perak Tengah District